There have been four NASCAR Busch Series races named Granger Select 200:

 Granger Select 200 (Louisville), held at Louisville Speedway in Louisville, Kentucky in 1988 and 1989
 Granger Select 200 (Nashville), held at Nashville Fairgrounds Speedway in Nashville, Tennessee in 1989
 Granger Select 200 (Hickory), held at Hickory Speedway in 1990
 Granger Select 200 (Dublin), held at New River Valley Speedway in Dublin, Virginia from 1990 to 1992